Weeks 533 is a  capacity Clyde Iron Works model 52 barge-mounted crane which is the largest revolving floating crane on the East Coast of the United States. It was originally ordered for bridge construction and has since been used in several notable heavy lifts.

History
The Marine Boss floating barge-crane was built for Murphy Pacific Marine. The barge was assembled by Zidell Explorations from scrapped ship steel in Oregon in 1966 and fitted in San Francisco with a heavy 500-ton revolving crane made by Clyde Iron Works to perform the heavy girder and deck-section lifts for construction of the 1967 San Mateo-Hayward Bridge. At the time it was the largest barge crane in the western United States.

In the 1970s, Marine Boss was sold to J. Ray McDermott & Co., who had introduced the first 500-ton floating cranes for offshore platform construction in 1965 and were operating a similar fleet of barge-cranes under the McDermott Derrick Barge (DB) class. McDermott would later sell it for scrap in 1988 to Weeks Marine in New Jersey, who renamed it the Weeks 533 and refurbished it from 1997-2000. Weeks 533 is considered the flagship of the Weeks fleet.

One of the tugboats returning Weeks 533 from Albany to New Jersey collided with the moored 750t crane barge N181 (aka Hank Hummel) near the Tappan Zee Bridge at night in heavy fog on 12 March 2016. That tug, the Specialist, subsequently sank, killing all three sailors. Although the mate, who was at the helm of Specialist,  initially jumped clear from the stricken tug onto N181, he returned to help free a trapped crewmate and all hands aboard subsequently drowned.

Capacity
The Clyde Iron Works Model 52-DE crane can lift  using the main hoist on a  boom at any point in the crane's revolution; capacity rises to  when using the main hoist oriented astern. Motive power for the main hoist is provided by a Caterpillar 3412 V-12 diesel engine, and electric power for the barge is provided by a Caterpillar 3406 I-6 diesel generator set.

Bridges built
 Rio Vista Bridge replacement span (1967)
 San Mateo–Hayward Bridge (1967)
 San Diego–Coronado Bridge (1969)
 Queensway Twin Bridges (1971), near  at the Port of Long Beach
 Fremont Bridge (Portland) (1973)

Notable heavy lifts
 UGM-73 Poseidon missile test facility structural members at Hunters Point Naval Shipyard (1967)
 SEALAB III, off the coast of San Clemente Island (1969)
 Pier protection system for the Tappan Zee Bridge (2000)
 The capsized MV Stellamare at the Port of Albany–Rensselaer (2003, as a team with Donjon's Chesapeake 1000)
 The downed hull of US Airways Flight 1549 (2009) from the Hudson River
 Concorde G-BOAD on Pier 86 (2008) and Enterprise (2012) onto the Intrepid Sea, Air & Space Museum
 The old main span of the East 78th Street pedestrian bridge and the replacement span (2011–2012) over FDR Drive
 The replacement New York–New Jersey Rail Greenville Yard transfer bridge (2013) in the wake of Hurricane Sandy
 Steel jacket foundations for Block Island Wind Farm (2015)
 Cleanup of the WTC in New York City from the 9/11 attacks, moored below 55 Water Street.

References

External links

 
 Pictures of Weeks 533 in dry dock
 
 
 
 
 
 

Crane vessels
Individual cranes (machines)
Port of New York and New Jersey